Liang Hua (born 1964) is a Chinese business executive and the current chairman of Huawei Technologies Co., Ltd.

Biography
Liang was born in 1964 in Banyue Town of Dangyang, Hubei. He secondary studied at Dangyang No. 1 High School. He graduated from Northwestern Polytechnical University.

He joined the Huawei Technologies Co., Ltd. in 1995, where he successively served as president of its logistics and supply-chain management system, president of its process and IT management department, president of its global technology services, director of its audit committee, and chairman of its board of supervisors. In March 2018, he was elected chairman of Huawei Technologies Co., Ltd. and director-general of Shareholding Staff Council.

References 

1964 births
Businesspeople from Hubei
Living people
Huawei people
20th-century Chinese businesspeople
21st-century Chinese businesspeople
Northwestern Polytechnical University alumni
Wuhan University of Technology alumni